Shirley Muldowney's Top Fuel Challenge is a 1987 video game published by Cosmi Corporation.

Gameplay
Shirley Muldowney's Top Fuel Challenge is a game in which the version of track conditions involves wins, losses, and crashes.

Reception
David M. Wilson and Johnny L. Wilson reviewed Shirley Muldowney's Top Fuel Challenge with Top Fuel Eliminator for Computer Gaming World, and stated that "Of the two games, one must - note that TFE is more user-friendly. Whereas TFC simply notes the player's failures, TFE offers a full-scale evaluation of every qualifying run."

Commodore User were very critical of the game, stating the graphics were "abysmal" with "god-awful animation" and the sound "limited". Their conclusion was that the title "does succeed in being authentic in one respect. It's a real drag." It was rated 3/10.

Zzap!64 were similarly unimpressed, saying the 3D effect was "appalling" and the backdrops "dismal". The sound effects were said to be "feeble." Their conclusion was that it was "a slow, uninteresting and appallingly presented racing simulation". Overall score was 13%.

References

External links
Review in Info

1987 video games
Commodore 64 games
Commodore 64-only games
Cosmi Corporation games
Drag racing
Racing video games
Video games based on real people
Video games developed in the United States